Sakes Alive! is an old-fashioned mild oath, popular in the 1930s, 40s and 50s. Derives from Land(s) sakes (alive), with Lands standing for Lord’s. Equivalent to today's “My Goodness”, “Good Lord”, “Oh my God” or the most closely related "For God's Sake."

English phrases